Opel Szentgotthárd is a manufacturing company that belongs to Opel.

History 
The company was founded on 26 July 1990. The headquarters is in Szentgotthárd in western Hungary. In 1992, the assembly of automobiles and engines began. In 2000 the vehicle construction was stopped. In February 2016, Grzegorz Buchal succeeded Tamás Solt as chief executive officer. In March 2017, 1200 people were employed.

Products
The company manufactured Opel Astra and Opel Vectra. One source gives the period 12 March 1992 to 1998 for the Astra and 1998 to 2000 for the Vectra. A total of 85,000 vehicles were built.

Engine manufacture includes both gasoline and diesel engines. According to a factory expansion announced for 2012, the engines should only be used for vehicles from Opel and Vauxhall. Almost 512,000 engines have been handed over for 1999 and 2015. The maximum value was reached in 2016 with 629,199 engines. In 2017 the number fell to 486,000 and in 2018 to 313,000.

References

External links

Opel factories
Car manufacturers of Hungary
Hungarian companies established in 1990
Vehicle manufacturing companies established in 1990